Rule Wynn and Rule was a Canadian architectural firm that had offices in Calgary and Edmonton. The firm is noted for its prominent role in bringing modern architecture to Alberta.

History
Founded by John Ulric Rule (1904-1978) and Gordon K. Wynn (1910-1994) in Edmonton in 1938, they were joined a year later by Rule's brother, Peter Leitch Rule (1913-1964). The initial partnership came about as neither Rule nor Wynn could find work. All three partners were graduates of the school of architecture at the University of Alberta.

During World War II the Rule brother's father, also named Peter, took charge of the firm. Peter worked as a building inspector for Alberta Government Telephones and during his time with the firm designed several telephone exchange buildings across the province. Although not trained as an architect, in January 1941 he was given a special certificate by the Alberta Association of Architects.

In 1945 the firm opened a second office in Calgary which was headed by Peter Rule (son). This office closed in 1986.

Since 1938 the firm has gone through numerous name changes culminating in 1997 as HIP (Henderson Inglis Partridge) Architects. In 2013 on the cusp of 75 years Stewart Inglis and Randy Krebes merged the firm with Kasian Architecture. Allan Partridge (who left HIP in 2011) continues the ethos, vision and commitment by Rule Wynn Rule to innovation with Next Architecture in Edmonton and Calgary.  In Calgary they operate out of Elvenden Centre; designed by Rule Wynn Rule in the 60's.

The records of both the Edmonton and Calgary firms are held at the Canadian Architectural Archives in Calgary.

Works

Edmonton Firm

Calgary Firm

References

Fraser, Linda. "Rule Wynn and Rule." In The Canadian Encyclopedia Online. http://www.thecanadianencyclopedia.ca/en/article/rule-wynn-and-rule/
The Rule Wynn and Rule (Edmonton) Architectural Drawings: An Inventory of the Collection at the Canadian Architectural Archives at the University of Calgary Library. Edited by Kathy E. Zimon with an Introduction by Geoffrey Simmons. Calgary: University of Calgary Press: 1997.

Architecture firms of Canada